The following is a list of players who have captained the Gold Coast Suns in the Australian Football League (AFL).

AFL

AFL Women's

References

Gold Coast SUNS announce 2011 leaders

Gold Coast
captains
Gold Coast, Queensland-related lists